Hoseynabad (also Romanized as Ḩoseynābād; also known as Ḩoseynābād-e Pākūh) is a village in Kamin Rural District, in the Central District of Pasargad County, Fars Province, Iran. At the 2006 census, its population was 36, in 11 families.

References 

Populated places in Pasargad County